The Lower Dibang Valley district (Pron:/dɪˈbæŋ/) is an administrative district in the state of Arunachal Pradesh in northeastern India. It is the tenth least populous district in the country.

History

In June 1980, the Dibang Valley district was created from part of the Lohit district. On 16 December 2001, the Dibang Valley district was bifurcated into Dibang Valley district and Lower Dibang Valley district.

Geography and timeline
The headquarters of the district is Roing. Before it was carved out of the district on 16 December 2001, Anini housed the district headquarters.

Transport
The proposed  Arunachal Pradesh Frontier Highway goes along the McMahon Line, and will pass through the Lower Dibang Valley district. An alignment map can be seen here and here. It will intersect with the proposed East-West Industrial Corridor Highway.

Divisions
There are two Arunachal Pradesh Legislative Assembly constituencies located in this district: Dambuk and Roing. Both are part of the Arunachal East Lok Sabha constituency.

Demographics
According to the 2011 census, the Lower Dibang Valley district has a population of 54,080, roughly equal to the nation of Saint Kitts and Nevis. This makes it the 630th most populous district in India (out of a total of 640). Its rate of population growth rate from 2001–2011 was 7.01%. The Lower Dibang Valley has a sex ratio of 919 females for every 1000 males, and a literacy rate of 70.38%. Scheduled Tribes make up 48.03% of the population.

Religion

Languages
Major languages spoken include Idu Mishmi and Adi. Hindi has been taught in schools since the 1970s. Most of the citizens understand and speak Hindi. In other various areas, different languages are spoken, such as Nepali and Assamese. English is also spoken by educated citizens.

At the time of the 2011 census, 24.29% of the population spoke Nepali, 23.03% Adi, 15.15% Mishmi, 7.04% Bengali, 7.02% Mishing, 4.54% Bhojpuri, 3.75% Assamese, 2.83% Hindi and 2.23% Galo as their first language.

Flora and fauna
The district is rich in wildlife. Rare mammals such as Mishmi takin, red goral, elephants, wild water buffalos and leaf muntjac live in the district. Birds that live in the Lower Dibang Valley include Sclater's monal, Blyth's tragopan, the rufous-necked hornbill, the Bengal florican, and the white-winged wood duck.  Mishmi Hills giant flying squirrels (Petaurista mishmiensis) also live in this district.

A new subspecies of hoolock gibbon has been discovered in this area, which was named the Mishmi Hills hoolock. H. h. mishmiensis.

References

External links
 Official website

2011 establishments in Arunachal Pradesh
Districts of Arunachal Pradesh